Eva Berná (born 25 May 1986) is a Paralympian athlete from the Czech Republic competing mainly in category F37 shot put events.

She competed in the 2000 Summer Paralympics in Sydney, Australia. There she competed in the F37 discus, javelin and shot put events but failed to win any medals.

She competed in the 2004 Summer Paralympics in Athens, Greece. There she won a bronze medal in the women's F37-38 shot put event but failed to win a medal in either the F37 discus or F35-38 Javelin

She also competed in the 2008 Summer Paralympics in Beijing, China. There she won her second bronze medal in the women's F37-38 shot put event but again failed to medal in the F37/38 discus

References

External links 
 
 Article at HandiSport.cz

1986 births
Living people
Czech female discus throwers
Czech female javelin throwers
Czech female shot putters
Paralympic athletes of the Czech Republic
Paralympic bronze medalists for the Czech Republic
Athletes (track and field) at the 2004 Summer Paralympics
Athletes (track and field) at the 2008 Summer Paralympics
Athletes (track and field) at the 2012 Summer Paralympics
Athletes (track and field) at the 2016 Summer Paralympics
Medalists at the 2004 Summer Paralympics
Medalists at the 2008 Summer Paralympics
Medalists at the 2012 Summer Paralympics
Medalists at the 2016 Summer Paralympics
Paralympic medalists in athletics (track and field)